Gastrointestinal intraepithelial neoplasia (GIN or GIIN), also known as "digestive epithelial dysplasia" is abnormal growth (cellular dysplasia) of digestive epithelial cells in the digestive mucosa.

Gastrointestinal intraepithelial neoplasia is the potentially premalignant transformation.

Since 2000, they are classified according to the Vienna classification.

References

Lesion